Dziewulski (feminine: Dziewulska; plural: Dziewulscy) is a Polish surname. Notable people with this surname include:

 Jan Dziewulski, founder of Opoczno S.A., the largest producer of ceramic tiles in Poland
 Marcin Dziewulski (born 1982), Polish footballer
 Maria Dziewulska (1909–2006), Polish composer and music educator
 Władysław Dziewulski (1878–1962), Polish astronomer and mathematician

See also
 

Polish-language surnames